Bringing Up Father is an American radio situation comedy show based on the comic strip Bringing Up Father by George McManus. It aired from July 1 to September 30, 1941, each Tuesday at 9 p.m. on NBC Radio. Each episode was a half-hour long. The sponsor was Lever Brothers.

Plot

Much like the comic strip each episode featured Jiggs' family in domestic hijinks, with Jiggs usually the victim of his wife's anger.

Cast
 Jiggs: Mark Smith, Neil O'Malley.
 Maggie: Agnes Moorehead
 Nora: Helen Shields, Joan Banks
 Dinty Moore: Craig McDonnell

Theme song

The music was composed by Merle Kendrick.

Jiggs, stand up and be a man, 

Don't let Maggie get under your collar

Jiggs, be a man for once

And stand up and holler

Jiggs, it's time you make your stand

But it's sure not to make us quit singing of "Bringing Up Father"

Audio example
Internet Archive: Bringing Up Father 
Note: This audio example is actually from the 1931 version of the Bringing Up Father radio show, made under the supervision of the William Morris Agency. The 1931 transcription program of Bringing Up Father was originally broadcast by The Yankee Chain, which consisted of seven New England radio stations operated by the Shepherd Broadcasting Company.

Sources

Bringing Up Father
American comedy radio programs
1941 radio programme debuts
1941 radio programme endings
Radio programs based on comic strips
NBC Blue Network radio programs
NBC radio programs
1940s American radio programs
Radio programs about families